Verticordia ovalifolia, commonly known as oval-leaved featherflower, is a flowering plant in the myrtle family, Myrtaceae and is endemic to the south-west of Western Australia. It is an openly branched shrub with egg-shaped leaves and strap-like, feathery petals in spring.

Description

Flowering time is from August to December.

Taxonomy and naming
Verticordia ovalifolia was first formally described by Carl Meisner in 1857 from a specimen collected by James Drummond and the description was published in Journal of the Proceedings of the Linnean Society, Botany. The specific epithet (ovalifolia) is "from the Latin ovalis (oval) and folium (a leaf), in reference to the leaf shape".

When Alex George reviewed the genus Verticordia in 1991, he placed this species in subgenus Eperephes, the only species in section Corynatoca.

Distribution and habitat
This verticordia usually grows in sand, sometimes with lateritic gravel, often with other species of Verticordia, usually in heath and shrubland. It occurs in two disjunct areas between Perth and Geraldton and another between Dumbleyung and Lake King in the Avon Wheatbelt, Geraldton Sandplains, Jarrah Forest, Mallee and Swan Coastal Plain biogeographic regions.

Conservation status
Verticordia ovalifolia is classified as "not threatened" by the Western Australian Government Department of Parks and Wildlife.

Use in horticulture
Oval-leaved featherflower is described as "a beautiful, attractively foliaged shrub" which has been grown in gardens and in pots in a range of well-drained soils. It is usually propagated from cuttings although it can also be grown from seed. Grafting onto Chamelaucium uncinatum rootstock has produced bushy shrubs that bear large numbers of flowers.

References

ovalifolia
Rosids of Western Australia
Eudicots of Western Australia
Plants described in 1857
Taxa named by Carl Meissner